The Main Caucasian Range is a mountain range in the Russian Federation, Georgia and Azerbaijan. It is the dividing range of the Greater Caucasus.

The protected areas of the range are the Teberda Nature Reserve, Kabardino-Balkaria Nature Reserve and the North Ossetia Nature Reserve.

Geography
The Main Caucasian Range marks the divide between the North Caucasus to the north and the South Caucasus to the south. It stretches from Mount Chugush near the Black Sea, to the Khizi District of Azerbaijan near the Caspian Sea. The main range runs parallel to the southern side of the Lateral Range, along Abkhazia, Adygea, the Krasnodar Territory, Karachay-Cherkessia, Kabardino-Balkaria, North Ossetia, Ingushetia, Chechnya and Dagestan federal subjects of Russia, as well as the countries of Georgia and Azerbaijan. The range is characterized by numerous alpine landforms and, unlike its parallel ranges to the north, it forms a continuous, uninterrupted, system of mountain ranges. 

The Main Caucasian Range forms a watershed, separating the basins of rivers flowing on the northern slopes of the Greater Caucasus, such as the Samur, Kuban, Terek and Sulak, from those flowing on the southern slopes of the mountain system, such as the Kodori, Enguri, Rioni and Kura. 

The highest and rockiest section of the range is located in its central part.

There are several glaciated areas in the range system, including Bezengi the largest glacier in the Caucasus.

See also
Highest points of Russian Federal subjects
List of mountains and hills of Russia
Skalisty Range, Caucasus

References

External links

Schematic maps of the Caucasus (in Russian)

Mountain ranges of Russia
Mountain ranges of Azerbaijan
Mountain ranges of Georgia (country)
Mountain ranges of the Caucasus
Mountain ranges of Europe